Elysia abei is a species of sea slug, a marine gastropod mollusc in the family Plakobranchidae. They are found off the Pacific coast of Japan in Sagami Bay.

References

 Baba, K. (1955). "Opisthobranchia of Sagami Bay, Supplement". Tokyo: Iwanami Shoten.
 Jensen K.R. (2007) Biogeography of the Sacoglossa (Mollusca, Opisthobranchia). Bonner Zoologische Beiträge 55:255–281

Plakobranchidae
Gastropods described in 1955